Synaphe punctalis is a moth of the family Pyralidae described by Johan Christian Fabricius in 1775. It is found in Europe.

The wingspan is 22–27 mm. The moth flies in one generation from June to August and are attracted to light.

The caterpillars feed on mosses.

Notes
The flight season refers to Belgium and the Netherlands. This may vary in other parts of the range.

External links
 Synaphe punctalis on UKMoths

Pyralini
Moths described in 1775
Moths of Europe
Moths of Asia
Taxa named by Johan Christian Fabricius